Reinhard Eugen Bösch (born 16 January 1957) is an Austrian politician who is a Member of the National Council for the Freedom Party of Austria (FPÖ). He is a former Member of the Federal Council.

References

1957 births
Living people
Members of the Federal Council (Austria)
Members of the National Council (Austria)
Freedom Party of Austria politicians
21st-century Austrian politicians
20th-century Austrian politicians